Nicholas A. Kotov (born August 29, 1965, Moscow, USSR) is the Irving Langmuir Distinguished Professor of Chemical Sciences and Engineering at the University of Michigan in Ann Arbor, MI, USA. Nicholas A. Kotov (born August 29, 1965, Moscow, USSR) is the Irving Langmuir Distinguished Professor of Chemical Sciences and Engineering at the University of Michigan in Ann Arbor, MI, USA. He is a pioneer of theoretical foundations and practical implementations of complex systems from ‘imperfect’ particles. Prof. Kotov demonstrated that the ability to self-organize is the unifying property of all inorganic nanoparticles.   The complexity of the resulting materials can dramatically increase as their dimensionality and symmetry decrease.[need ref for this] Such self-assembly regimes lead to high-performance nanocomposites with a spectrum of desirable but contradictory properties that were once thought to be unattainable.   Examples of such materials include widely utilized layered organic-inorganic composites from highly polydispersed one-dimensional (1D) and two-dimensional (2D) nanostructures.    Self-assembly of irregular chiral nanoparticles and biosimilar materials with high functional complexity described by graph theory represent the focal point of his current work.  
Kotov is a recipient of more than 60 societal, national, and international awards and recognitions. Together with his students, He founded several startup companies that commercialized self-assembled nanostructures for the energy, healthcare, and automotive industries. Kotov is a Fellow of America Academy of Arts and Sciences and National Academy of Inventors.  He is also an advocate of scientists with disabilities. 

ACADEMIC WORK: 
Kotov is known for the creation of complex functional systems from ‘imperfect’ nanoparticles. They are easily sourced by chemical synthesis using naturally abundant minerals and have wide size distribution and high diversity of geometrical shapes. These irregularities favor the formation of disorganized stochastic agglomerates, with properties that were previously considered an unsurmountable fundamental barrier for their self-organization into complex structures, such as multiparticle colloidal crystals. 
In mid-1990s, Kotov showed that a wide spectrum of stratified composites engineered with nanoscale precision can be created from highly polydispersed low-dimensional nanomaterials utilizing electrostatic restrictions of layer-by-layer assembly (LbL).  Using a large family 1D nanomaterials, including nanofibers, nanotubes, and nanowires, Kotov created high-performance composites from them using rod-like crystals of cellulose  and nanofibers of collagen . An equally large group of 2D nanomaterials includes nanosheets, nanoribbons, and nanoplatelets.  The early works of Kotov described high-performance composites from nanosheets of graphite oxide  and nanoplatelets of natural clays   

The methodologies developed by Kotov enable the design complex materials from low dimensional   ceramics, polymers, dielectrics, semiconductors, metals,andcombinations thereof. The high-performance nanocomposites made from alternating strata of organic and inorganic layers from 2D nanomaterials are often considered as analogs of biomineralized tissues such as bone, nacre, and enamel that are well known for their unique mechanical properties. Inclusion of carbon- and metal-based 2D nanomaterials enabled the development of ultrastrong composites  that could also be electrically conductive,  optically active , and molecularly selective .
In 2010-2020, Kotov extended the realization of electrostatically restricted assemblies from surfaces to solutions. He had shown that reduction of symmetry is essential for the emergence of complexity in the systems of ‘imperfect’ nanoparticles.  He demonstrated that nanoscale chirality, that is, lack of some symmetry operations possible for perfect spheres, rods, or sheets, leads to exceptionally complexity rivaling or exceeding those found in prototypical evolution-perfected biological structures . Exploration of electrostatically restricted self-assembly of chiral nanoparticles led to a large family of exceptionally complex particles with sophisticated assembly patterns for biomedical , catalytic  , and photonic  technologies.

References

External links
 Group research website
 Google Scholar - Nicholas A. Kotov

21st-century American chemists
University of Michigan faculty
1965 births
Living people